Ijaz Ahmed (b: 26 April 1981) is an international wushu competitor from Pakistan. He won a silver medal at the 2010 Asian Games in Guangzhou, China.He won a gold medal at 2006 South Asian Games in Colombo, Sri Lanka. He is the only silver medalist from Pakistan in any martial arts at the Asian Games.

Career

2010
Ahmed participated in Sanshou (75 kg) category at the 2010 Asian Games in China in November. In the quarter finals he defeated Turkmenistan's Serdar Mamedov by 2 to 1 before defeating Mongolia's Batjargal Magsarjav 2-0 to reach the final where he was defeated by Iran's Hamidreza Gholipour 2-0.

References

1981 births
Living people
Asian Games silver medalists for Pakistan
Wushu practitioners at the 2010 Asian Games
Pakistani sanshou practitioners
Asian Games medalists in wushu
Wushu practitioners at the 2006 Asian Games

Medalists at the 2010 Asian Games
21st-century Pakistani people